Bill Irvine MBE (30 January 1926 – 13 February 2008) and Bobbie Irvine  MBE (27 July 1932 – 30 May 2004) were British professional ballroom dancers. Bobbie Irvine was born Bobbie Barwell in Oudtshoorn, South Africa, while Bill Irvine, born William, was from Low Craigends in Kilsyth. His father was a miner, as was his grandfather, and Bill served in the Royal Navy before starting his dance career. As a young dance teacher he spent a period in South Africa, which led to his meeting Bobbie. They were married in 1957. The pair became South African champions, and later settled in London.

The Irvines won 13 world titles between 1960 and 1968 in the Professional Latin and Professional Modern categories of ballroom dancing. Their principal ballroom teachers were Eric Hancox, Len Scrivener and Sonny Binnick. They were coached in the Latin dances by Nina Hunt, who became a great friend of the couple.

They were honoured for their achievements during their careers by appointment as MBE in 1967, the first such award made for Ballroom dancing.

Competition record 
The Irvines' main competitive titles were:

1960: World 9 Dance, World Ballroom
1961: World Latin
1962: World 9 Dance; International, British and World Ballroom
1963: World, British Star and International Ballroom; World 9 Dance
1964: World, British and Star Ballroom
1965: World and Star Latin
1966: World, British and Star Ballroom
1967: World and Star Ballroom
1968: Star Ballroom; World Ballroom; World Latin

References 

British ballroom dancers
Entertainer duos
Members of the Order of the British Empire
Married couples